Omar Ashmawy is staff director and chief counsel of the Office of Congressional Ethics.

He was born in Jersey City but grew up in Westfield, New Jersey. His father was an immigrant from Egypt. His mother was an immigrant from Italy. His mother was Catholic, but Ashmawy was reared in his father's faith tradition and grew up as a practicing Muslim.

Ashmawy attended George Washington University, earning both an undergraduate and a law degree.  He joined the United States Air Force after law school, serving in the Judge Advocate General's Corps (JAG).  As JAG staff, he was one of the four prosecutors on the Salim Hamdan terrorism case.

References

Year of birth missing (living people)
Living people
New Jersey lawyers
People from Jersey City, New Jersey
People from Westfield, New Jersey
United States congressional aides
George Washington University alumni
George Washington University Law School alumni